José Paulo da Graça Antunes Lopes (born 16 October 2000) is a Portuguese freestyle and medley swimmer. He competed in the 2020 Summer Olympics.

References

2000 births
Living people
Sportspeople from Braga
Swimmers at the 2020 Summer Olympics
Portuguese male freestyle swimmers
Portuguese male medley swimmers
Olympic swimmers of Portugal
Swimmers at the 2018 Summer Youth Olympics
21st-century Portuguese people